The prime minister of India is the head of government of the Republic of India. Executive authority is vested in the prime minister and their chosen Council of Ministers, despite the president of India being the nominal head of the executive.  The prime minister is often the leader of the party or the coalition with a majority in the lower house of the Parliament of India, the Lok Sabha, which is the main legislative body in the Republic of India. The prime minister and their cabinet are at all times responsible to the Lok Sabha. 

The prime minister is appointed by the president of India; however the prime minister has to enjoy the confidence of the majority of Lok Sabha members, who are directly elected every five years, lest the prime minister shall resign. The prime minister can be a member of the Lok Sabha or of the Rajya Sabha, the upper house of the parliament. The prime minister controls the selection and dismissal of members of the Union Council of Ministers; and allocation of posts to members within the government. 

The longest-serving prime minister was Jawaharlal Nehru, also the first prime minister, whose tenure lasted 16 years and 286 days. His premiership was followed by Lal Bahadur Shastri's short tenure and Indira Gandhi's 11- and 4-year-long tenures, both politicians belonging to the Indian National Congress. After Indira Gandhi's assassination, her son Rajiv Gandhi took charge until 1989, when a decade with six unstable governments began. This was followed by the full terms of Atal Bihari Vajpayee, Manmohan Singh, and Narendra Modi. Modi is the 14th and current prime minister of India, serving since 26 May 2014.

Origins and history
India follows a parliamentary system in which the prime minister is the presiding head of the government and chief of the executive of the government. In such systems, the head of state, or, the head of state's official representative (i.e., the monarch, president, or governor-general) usually holds a purely ceremonial position and acts—on most matters—only on the advice of the prime minister.

The prime minister—if they are not already—must become a member of parliament within six months of beginning his/her tenure. A prime minister is expected to work with other central ministers to ensure the passage of bills by the parliament.

1947–1984 

Since 1947, there have been 14 different prime ministers. The first few decades after 1947 saw the Indian National Congress' (INC) near complete domination over the political map of India. India's first prime minister—Jawaharlal Nehru—took oath on 15 August 1947. Nehru went on to serve as prime minister for 17 consecutive years, winning four general elections in the process. His tenure ended in May 1964, on his death. After the death of Nehru, Lal Bahadur Shastri—a former home minister and a leader of the Congress party—ascended to the position of prime minister. Shastri's tenure saw the Indo-Pakistani War of 1965. Shashtri subsequently died of a reported heart attack in Tashkent, after signing the Tashkent Declaration.

After Shastri, Indira Gandhi—Nehru's daughter—was elected as the country's first woman prime minister. Indira's first term in office lasted 11 years, in which she took steps such as nationalisation of banks; end of allowances and political posts, which were received by members of the royal families of the erstwhile princely states of British India. In addition, events such as the Indo-Pakistani War of 1971; the establishment of a sovereign Bangladesh; accession of Sikkim to India, through a referendum in 1975; and India's first nuclear test in Pokhran occurred during Indira's first term. In 1975, President Fakhruddin Ali Ahmed—on Indira's advice—imposed a state of emergency, therefore, bestowing the government with the power to rule by decree, the period is known for human right violations.

After widespread protests, the emergency was lifted in 1977, and a general election was to be held. All of the political parties of the opposition—after the conclusion of the emergency—fought together against the Congress, under the umbrella of the Janata Party, in the general election of 1977, and were successful in defeating the Congress. Subsequently, Morarji Desai—a former deputy prime minister—became the first non-Congress prime minister of India. The government of prime minister Desai was composed of groups with opposite ideologies, in which unity and co-ordination were difficult to maintain. Ultimately, after two and a half years as PM; on 28 July 1979, Morarji tendered his resignation to the president; and his government fell. Thereafter, Charan Singh—a deputy prime minister in Desai's cabinet—with outside, conditional support from Congress, proved a majority in Lok Sabha and took oath as prime minister. However, Congress pulled its support shortly after, and Singh had to resign; he had a tenure of 5 months, the shortest in the history of the office.

In 1980, after a three-year absence, the Congress returned to power with an absolute majority. Indira Gandhi was elected prime minister a second time. During her second tenure, Operation Blue Star—an Indian Army operation inside the Golden Temple, the most sacred site in Sikhism—was conducted, resulting in reportedly thousands of deaths. Subsequently, on 31 October 1984, Gandhi was shot dead by Satwant Singh and Beant Singh—two of her bodyguards—in the garden of her residence at 1, Safdarjung Road, New Delhi.

1984–1999 
After Indira, Rajiv—her eldest son and 40 years old at the time—was sworn in on the evening of 31 October 1984, becoming the youngest person ever to hold the office of prime minister. Rajiv immediately called for a general election. In the subsequent general election, the Congress secured an absolute majority, winning 401 of 552 seats in the Lok Sabha, the maximum number received by any party in the history of India. Vishwanath Pratap Singh—first finance minister and then later defence minister in Gandhi's cabinet—uncovered irregularities, in what became known as the Bofors scandal, during his stint at the Ministry of Defence; Singh was subsequently expelled from Congress and formed the Janata Dal and—with the help of several anti-Congress parties—also formed the National Front, a coalition of many political parties.

In the general election of 1989, the National Front—with outside support from the Bharatiya Janata Party (BJP) and the Left Front—came to power. V. P. Singh was elected prime minister. During a tenure of less than a year, Singh and his government accepted the Mandal Commission's recommendations. Singh's tenure came to an end after he ordered the arrest of BJP member Lal Krishna Advani, as a result, BJP withdrew its outside support to the government, V. P. Singh lost the subsequent vote-of-no-confidence 146–320 and had to resign. After V. P. Singh's resignation, Chandra Shekhar along with 64 members of parliament (MPs) floated the Samajwadi Janata Party (Rashtriya), and proved a majority in the Lok Sabha with support from Congress. But Shekhar's premiership did not last long, Congress proceeded to withdraw its support; Shekhar's government fell as a result, and new elections were announced.

In the general election of 1991, Congress—under the leadership of P. V. Narasimha Rao—formed a minority government; Rao became the first PM of South Indian origin. After the dissolution of the Soviet Union, India was on the brink of bankruptcy, so, Rao took steps to liberalise the economy, and appointed Manmohan Singh—an economist and a former governor of the Reserve Bank of India—as finance minister. Rao and Singh then took various steps to liberalise the economy, these resulted in an unprecedented economic growth in India. His premiership, however, was also a witness to the demolition of the Babri Masjid, which resulted in the death of about 2,000 people. Rao, however, did complete five continuous years in office, becoming the first prime minister outside of the Nehru—Gandhi family to do so.

After the end of Rao's tenure in May 1996, the nation saw four prime ministers in a span of three years, two tenures of Atal Bihari Vajpayee; one tenure of H. D. Deve Gowda from 1 June 1996 to 21 April 1997; and one tenure of I. K. Gujral from 21 April 1997 to 19 March 1998. The government of Prime Minister Vajpayee—elected in 1998—took some concrete steps. In May 1998—after a month in power—the government announced the conduct of five underground nuclear explosions in Pokhran. In response to these tests, many western countries, including the United States, imposed economic sanctions on India, but, due to the support received from Russia, France, the Gulf countries and some other nations, the sanctions—were largely—not considered successful. A few months later in response to the Indian nuclear tests, Pakistan also conducted nuclear tests. Given the deteriorating situation between the two countries, the governments tried to improve bilateral relations. In February 1999, the India and Pakistan signed the Lahore Declaration, in which the two countries announced their intention to annul mutual enmity, increase trade and use their nuclear capabilities for peaceful purposes. In May 1999, All India Anna Dravida Munnetra Kazhagam withdrew from the ruling National Democratic Alliance (NDA) coalition; Vajpayee's government, hence, became a caretaker one after losing a motion-of-no-confidence 269–270, this coincided with the Kargil War with Pakistan. In the subsequent October 1999 general election, the BJP-led NDA and its affiliated parties secured a comfortable majority in the Lok Sabha, winning 299 of 543 seats in the lower house.

2000–present 

  
Vajpayee continued the process of economic liberalisation during his reign, resulting in economic growth. In addition to the development of infrastructure and basic facilities, the government took several steps to improve the infrastructure of the country, such as, the National Highways Development Project (NHDP) and the Pradhan Mantri Gram Sadak Yojana (PMGSY;;  Prime Minister Rural Road Scheme), for the development of roads. But during his reign, the 2002 Gujarat communal riots in the state of Gujarat took place; resulting in about 2,000 deaths. Vajpayee's tenure as prime minister came to an end in May 2004, making him the first non-Congress PM to complete a full five-year tenure.

In the 2004 election, the Congress emerged as the largest party in a hung parliament; Congress-led United Progressive Alliance (UPA)—with outside support from the Left Front, the Samajwadi Party (SP) and Bahujan Samaj Party (BSP) among others—proved a majority in the Lok Sabha, and Manmohan Singh was elected prime minister; becoming the first Sikh prime minister of the nation. During his tenure, the country retained the economic momentum gained during Prime Minister Vajpayee's tenure. Apart from this, the government succeeded in getting the National Rural Employment Guarantee Act, 2005, and the Right to Information Act, 2005 passed in the parliament. Further, the government strengthened India's relations with nations like Afghanistan; Russia; the Gulf states; and the United States, culminating with the ratification of India–United States Civil Nuclear Agreement near the end of Singh's first term. At the same time, the November 2008 Mumbai terrorist attacks also happened during Singh's first term in office. In the general election of 2009, the mandate of UPA increased. Prime Minister Singh's second term, however, was surrounded by accusations of high-level scandals and corruption. Singh resigned as prime minister on 17 May 2014, after Congress' defeat in the 2014 general election.

In the general election of 2014, the BJP-led NDA got an absolute majority, winning 336 out of 543 Lok Sabha seats; the BJP itself became the first party since 1984 to get a majority in the Lok Sabha. Narendra Modi—the Chief Minister of Gujarat—was elected prime minister, becoming the first prime minister to have been born in an independent India.

Narendra Modi was re-elected as prime minister in 2019 with a bigger mandate than that of 2014. The BJP-led NDA winning 354 seats out of which BJP secured 303 seats.

Party affiliation

Constitutional framework and position of Prime Minister 
The Constitution envisions a scheme of affairs in which the president of India is the head of state; in terms of Article 53 with office of the prime minister being the head of Council of Ministers to assist and advise the president in the discharge of his/her constitutional functions. To quote, Article 53, 74 and 75 provide as under;

 

Like most parliamentary democracies, the president's duties are mostly ceremonial as long as the constitution and the rule of law is obeyed by the cabinet and the legislature. The prime minister of India is the head of government and has the responsibility for executive power. The president's constitutional duty is to preserve, protect and defend the Constitution and the law per article 60. In the constitution of India, the prime minister is mentioned in only four of its articles (articles 74, 75, 78 and 366). The prime minister plays a crucial role in the government of India by enjoying majority in the Lok Sabha.

Appointment, tenure and removal

Eligibility
According to Article 84 of the Constitution of India, which sets the principle qualification for member of Parliament, and Article 75 of the Constitution of India, which sets the qualifications for the minister in the Union Council of Ministers, and the argument that the position of Prime Minister has been described as primus inter pares (the first among equals), A Prime Minister must:

 be a citizen of India.
 be a member of the Lok Sabha or the Rajya Sabha. If the person chosen as Prime Minister is neither a member of the Lok Sabha nor the Rajya Sabha at the time of selection, they must become a member of either of the houses within six months.
 be above 25 years of age if they are a member of the Lok Sabha, or, above 30 years of age if they are a member of the Rajya Sabha.
 not hold any office of profit under the government of India or the government of any state or under any local or other authority subject to the control of any of the said governments.

Once a candidate is elected as the prime minister, they must vacate their posts at any private or government companies and may take up the position only on completion of their term.

Oaths of office and secrecy

The prime minister is required to make and subscribe in the presence of the President of India before entering office, the oath of office and secrecy, as per the Third Schedule of the Constitution of India.

Oath of office:

Oath of secrecy:

Tenure and removal from office
The prime minister serves at 'the pleasure of the president', hence, a prime minister may remain in office indefinitely, so long as the president has confidence in him/her. However, a prime minister must have the confidence of Lok Sabha, the lower house of the Parliament of India.

The term of a prime minister can end before the end of a Lok Sabha's term, if a simple majority of its members no longer have confidence in him/her, this is called a vote-of-no-confidence. Three prime ministers, I. K. Gujral, H. D. Deve Gowda and Atal Bihari Vajpayee have been voted out from office this way. In addition, a prime minister can resign from office; Morarji Desai was the first prime minister to resign while in office.

Upon ceasing to possess the requisite qualifications to be a member of Parliament subject to the Representation of the People Act, 1951.

Role and power of the prime minister

Executive powers 

The prime minister leads the functioning and exercise of authority of the government of India. The president of India—subject to eligibility—invites a person who is commanding support of majority members of Lok Sabha to form the government of India—also known as the central government or Union government—at the national level and exercise its powers. In practice the prime minister nominates the members of their council of ministers to the president. They also work upon to decide a core group of ministers (known as the cabinet), as in charge of the important functions and ministries of the government of India.

The prime minister is responsible for aiding and advising the president in distribution of work of the government to various ministries and offices and in terms of the Government of India (Allocation of Business) Rules, 1961. The co-ordinating work is generally allocated to the Cabinet Secretariat. While the work of the government is generally divided into various ministries, the prime minister may retain certain portfolios if they are not allocated to any member of the cabinet.

The prime minister—in consultation with the cabinet—schedules and attends the sessions of the houses of parliament and is required to answer the question from the Members of Parliament to them as the in-charge of the portfolios in the capacity as prime minister of India.

Some specific ministries/department are not allocated to anyone in the cabinet but the prime minister themself. The prime minister is usually always in charge/head of:
 Ministry of Personnel, Public Grievances and Pensions (as Minister of Personnel, Public Grievances and Pensions)
 Cabinet Secretariat
 Appointments Committee of the Cabinet
Cabinet Committee on Security
Cabinet Committee on Economic Affairs
 NITI Aayog
 Department of Atomic Energy
 Department of Space
 Nuclear Command Authority

The prime minister represents the country in various delegations, high level meetings and international organisations that require the attendance of the highest government office, and also addresses to the nation on various issues of national or other importance.

Per Article 78 of the Constitution of India, the union cabinet and the president officially communicate through the prime minister. Otherwise, the Constitution recognises the prime minister as a member of the union cabinet only outside the sphere of union cabinet.

Administrative and appointment powers 
The prime minister recommends to the president—among others—names for the appointment of:

 Chief Election Commissioner of India (CEC) and other Election Commissioners of India (ECs)
 Comptroller and Auditor General of India (C&AG)
 Chairperson and members of the Union Public Service Commission (UPSC)
 Chief Information Commissioner of India (CIC) and Information Commissioners of India
 Chairperson and members of the finance commission (FC)
 Attorney General of India (AG) and Solicitor General of India (SG)

As the chairperson of Appointments Committee of the Cabinet (ACC), the prime minister—on the non-binding advice of the Cabinet Secretary of India led-Senior Selection Board (SSB)—decides the postings of top civil servants, such as, secretaries, additional secretaries and joint secretaries in the government of India. Further, in the same capacity, the PM decides the assignments of top military personnel such as the Chief of the Army Staff, Chief of the Air Staff, Chief of the Naval Staff and commanders of operational and training commands. In addition, the ACC also decides the posting of Indian Police Service officers—the All India Service for policing, which staffs most of the higher level law enforcement positions at federal and state level—in the government of India.

Also, as the Minister of Personnel, Public Grievances and Pensions, the PM also exercises control over the Indian Administrative Service (IAS), the country's premier civil service, which staffs most of the senior civil service positions; the Public Enterprises Selection Board (PESB); and the Central Bureau of Investigation (CBI), except for the selection of its director, who is chosen by a committee of: (a) the prime minister, as chairperson; (b) the leader of the opposition in Lok Sabha; and (c) the chief justice.

Unlike most other countries, the prime minister does not have much influence over the selection of judges, that is done by a collegium of judges consisting of the Chief Justice of India, four senior most judges of the Supreme Court of India and the chief justice—or the senior-most judge—of the concerned state high court. The executive as a whole, however, has the right to send back a recommended name to the collegium for reconsideration, this, however, is not a full Veto power, and the collegium can still put forward rejected name.

Legislative powers 
The prime minister acts as the leader of the house of the chamber of parliament—generally the Lok Sabha—they belongs to. In this role, the prime minister is tasked with representing the executive in the legislature, announces important legislation, and is further expected to respond to the opposition's concerns. Article 85 of the Indian constitution confers the president with the power to convene and end extraordinary sessions of the parliament; this power, however, is exercised only on the advice of the prime minister and his/her council, so in practice the prime minister does exercise some control over affairs of the parliament.

Languages of the Prime Minister's Office 

The official website of the Prime Minister's Office is available in 11 Indian languages namely Assamese, Bengali, Gujarati, Kannada, Malayalam, Meitei (Manipuri), Marathi, Odia, Punjabi, Tamil and Telugu, out of the 22 official languages of the Indian Republic, in addition to English and Hindi.

The eleven Indian language websites can be accessed at the following links:

 Assamese: http://www.pmindia.gov.in/asm/
 Bengali: http://www.pmindia.gov.in/bn/
 Gujarati: http://www.pmindia.gov.in/gu/
 Kannada: http://www.pmindia.gov.in/kn/
 Marathi: http://www.pmindia.gov.in/mr/
 Malayalam: http://www.pmindia.gov.in/ml/
 Meitei (Manipuri): http://www.pmindia.gov.in/mni/
 Odia: http://www.pmindia.gov.in/ory/
 Punjabi: http://www.pmindia.gov.in/pa/
 Tamil: http://www.pmindia.gov.in/ta/
 Telugu: http://www.pmindia.gov.in/te/

Compensation and benefits
Article 75 of the Constitution of India confers the Parliament with the power to decide the remuneration and other benefits of the prime minister and other ministers are to be decided by the Parliament. and is renewed from time to time. The original remunerations for the prime minister and other ministers were specified in the Part B of the second schedule of the constitution, which was later removed by an amendment.

In 2010, the Prime Minister's Office reported that the prime minister does not receive a formal salary, only monthly allowances. That same year The Economist reported that, on a purchasing power parity basis, the prime minister received an equivalent of $4106 per year. As a percentage of the country's per-capita GDP (gross domestic product), this is the lowest of all countries The Economist surveyed.

Residence 
The 7, Lok Kalyan Marg—previously called 7, Race Course Road—in New Delhi, currently serves as the official place of residence for the prime minister of India.

The residence during the tenure of Nehru, the first prime minister, was Teen Murti Bhavan. Lal Bahadur Shastri chose 10, Janpath as an official residence. Indira Gandhi resided at 1, Safdarjung Road. Rajiv Gandhi became the first prime minister to use 7, Lok Kalyan Marg as his residence, which was used by his successors.

Travel 

For ground travel, the prime minister uses a highly modified, armoured version of a Range Rover. The prime minister's motorcade comprises a fleet of vehicles, the core of which consists of at least three armoured BMW 7 Series sedans, two armoured Range Rovers, at least 8-10 BMW X5s, six Toyota Fortuners/Land Cruisers, and at least two Mercedes-Benz Sprinter ambulances.

For air travel, Boeing 777-300ERs designated by the call sign Air India One (AI-1 or AIC001) and maintained by the Indian Air Force are used. There are several helicopters, such as Mi-8, used for carrying the prime minister over short distances. These aircraft are operated by the Indian Air Force.

Protection 

The Special Protection Group (SPG) is charged with protecting the sitting prime minister and his/her family. The security is aided by the Central Reserve Police Force (CRPF), Border Security Force (BSF) and the Delhi Police to provide three-rung security for the estate.

Office 

The Prime Minister's Office (PMO) acts as the principal workplace of the prime minister. The office is located at South Block, and is a 20-room complex, and has the Cabinet Secretariat, the Ministry of Defence and the Ministry of External Affairs adjacent to it. The office is headed by the Principal Secretary to the Prime Minister of India, generally a former civil servant, mostly from the Indian Administrative Service (IAS) and rarely from the Indian Foreign Service (IFS).

Family

The prime minister's spouse sometimes accompanies him/her on foreign visits. The prime minister's family is also assigned protection by the Special Protection Group, though it was removed after Special Protection Group Act in 2019. The most prominent of the family of prime ministers is the Nehru–Gandhi family, which has had three prime ministers, J. L. Nehru, Indira Gandhi and Rajiv Gandhi. Many family members of former prime ministers are politicians.

Post-premiership 

Former prime ministers are entitled to a bungalow, and are also entitled the same facilities as those given to a serving cabinet minister, including a fourteen-member secretarial staff, for a period of five years; reimbursement of office expenses; six domestic executive-class air tickets each year; and security cover from the armed forces and police as established by law.

In addition, former prime ministers rank seventh on the Indian order of precedence, equivalent to chief ministers of states (within their respective states) and cabinet ministers. As a former member of the parliament, the prime minister also receives a pension after they leave office.

Some prime ministers have had significant careers after their tenure, including H. D. Deve Gowda, who remained a Member of the Lok Sabha until 2019, and Manmohan Singh, who continues to be a Member of the Rajya Sabha.

Death

Prime ministers are accorded a state funeral. It is customary for states and union territories to declare a day of mourning on the occasion of death of any former prime minister.

Commemoration 

Several institutions are named after prime ministers of India. The birth date of Jawaharlal Nehru is celebrated as children's day in India. Prime ministers are also commemorated on the postage stamps of several countries.

Prime ministerial funds 
The prime minister presides over various funds.

National Defence Fund 

The National Defence Fund (NDF) was set up the Indian government in 1962, in the aftermath of 1962 Sino-Indian War. The prime minister acts as chairperson of the fund's executive committee, while, the ministers of defence, finance and home act as the members of the executive committee, the finance minister also acts the treasurer of the committee. The secretary of the fund's executive committee is a joint secretary in the Prime Minister's Office, dealing with the subject of NDF. The fund—according to its website—is "entirely dependent on voluntary contributions from the public and does not get any budgetary support.". Donations to the fund are 100% tax-deductible under section 80G of the Income Tax Act, 1961.

Prime Minister's National Relief Fund 
The Prime Minister's National Relief Fund (PMNRF) was set up by the first prime minister of India—Jawaharlal Nehru—in 1948, to assist displaced people from Pakistan. The fund, now, is primarily used to assist the families of those who are killed during natural disasters such as earthquakes, cyclones and flood and secondarily to reimburse medical expenses of people with chronic and deadly diseases. Donations to the PMNRF are 100% tax-deductible under section 80G of the Income Tax Act, 1961.

Prime Minister's Citizen Assistance and Relief in Emergency Situations Fund (PM Cares Fund) 
In March 2020, after the rapid spread of the COVID - 19 virus from Wuhan to countries across the world, Prime Minister Narendra Modi announced the formation of a special fund to deal with any kind of emergency or distress situations like the COVID-19 pandemic. The fund being fully voluntary without any government budgetary support, PM Modi appealed to the public to donate generously towards the fund. Following this donors from all sections of the society donated whole heartedly. Initially in FY 2019-20 the fund received Rs 3076.62 crores in just 5 days of its announcement. Initially the fund was used to procure COVID emergency products like ventilators, PPE kits for frontline workers and also funding the vaccine resaearch efforts and procurement. By FY 2020-21 the corpus of the PM Cares Fund was around Rs 10990 crore.

Deputy Prime Minister

The post of deputy prime minister of India is not technically a constitutional post, nor is there any mention of it in an Act of Parliament. But historically, on various occasions, different governments have assigned one of their senior ministers as the deputy prime minister. There is neither constitutional requirement for filling the post of deputy PM, nor does the post provide any kind of special powers. Typically, senior cabinet ministers like the finance minister or the home minister are appointed as deputy prime minister. The post is considered to be the senior most in the cabinet after the prime minister and represents the government in his/her absence. Generally, deputy prime ministers have been appointed to strengthen the coalition governments. The first holder of this post was Vallabhbhai Patel, who was also the home minister in Jawaharlal Nehru's cabinet.

See also

 List of prime ministers of India
 President of India
 List of presidents of India
 Deputy Prime Minister of India
 Air transports of heads of state and government
 Official state car

Notes

References

External links

 
Parliament of India
India
1947 establishments in India